The 55th Golden Globe Awards, honoring the best in film and television for 1997, were held on January 18, 1998. The nominations were announced on December 18, 1997.

Winners and nominees

Film 

The following films received multiple nominations:

The following films received multiple wins:

Television 
The following programs received multiple nominations:
The following programs received multiple wins:

Ceremony

Presenters 

Gillian Anderson
Lauren Bacall
Alec Baldwin
Antonio Banderas
Brenda Blethyn
Minnie Driver
David Duchovny
Faye Dunaway
Michael J. Fox
Brendan Fraser
Jeff Goldblum
Anne Heche
Gregory Hines
Matt LeBlanc
Madonna
Edward Norton
Michelle Pfeiffer
Jada Pinkett Smith
Alan Rickman
Laura San Giacomo
Cybill Shepherd
Kevin Spacey

Cecil B. DeMille Award 
Shirley MacLaine

Miss Golden Globe 
Clementine Ford (daughter of Cybill Shepherd & David M. Ford)

Awards breakdown 
The following networks received multiple nominations:

The following networks received multiple wins:

Memorable ceremony moments 
The ceremony at the Beverly Hilton was notable for two memorable moments. First, when Christine Lahti was announced as the winner of Best Actress in a Television Drama, she was in the restroom and came out a few minutes later to accept. Also, after winning Best Actor in a Movie or Miniseries, Ving Rhames brought fellow nominee Jack Lemmon on stage to give his award to the elder actor.

See also
70th Academy Awards
18th Golden Raspberry Awards
4th Screen Actors Guild Awards
49th Primetime Emmy Awards
50th Primetime Emmy Awards
 51st British Academy Film Awards
 52nd Tony Awards
 1997 in film
 1997 in American television

References

055
1997 television awards
1997 film awards
January 1998 events in the United States
Golden